Listets may refer to the following places in Bulgaria:

 Listets, Burgas Province
 Listets, Silistra Province